Panchita, also known as Chanda Bazar, is a village in Bongaon sub-division in the North 24 Parganas district, state of West Bengal, India. It has a Post Office and it is the main bazar of Dharmapukuria Gram Panchayat which has 7 Villages of its own administrative block and 3 villages of Ganrapota Gram Panchayat. Dharmapukuria Gram Panchayat
consists of seven villages: Sukpukuria, Madhabpur, Savaipur, Monigram, Dharmapukuria, Raipur and Panchita.

Education
There is one high school called Chanda Lalit Mohan High School and four primary schools in Chanda Bazar.

Points of interest
There are two fish markets which are regularly opened from morning to night, and there is a vegetable market which is officially opened on Wednesday and Saturday.
It has a well-used picnic spot along with a huge market, Beside this an Allahabad Bank, a State Bank of India ATM, Chanda Lalit Mohan High School. Bongaon-Bagdaha Road and Nakful-Bediyapota Roads intersect here. Chanda Diamond Club and Arunodoy Songho are the main social clubs of Panchita

References 

Villages in North 24 Parganas district